Arouna Dang À Bissene (born 22 April 1993)  is a Cameroonian professional footballer who plays as a midfielder for Bamboutos FC.

His brother, Moustapha Ngae A-Bissene, is also a footballer.

References

External links
PrvaLiga profile 
Arouna Dang Bissene at Footballdatabase

1993 births
Living people
Cameroonian footballers
Association football forwards
Cameroonian expatriate footballers
NK Krka players
Club Atlético Huracán footballers
CS Constantine players
Slovenian PrvaLiga players
Algerian Ligue Professionnelle 1 players
Expatriate footballers in Slovenia
Expatriate footballers in Argentina
Expatriate footballers in Angola
Expatriate footballers in Algeria
Cameroonian expatriate sportspeople in Slovenia
Cameroonian expatriate sportspeople in Argentina
Cameroonian expatriate sportspeople in Angola
Cameroonian expatriate sportspeople in Algeria